The Roman Catholic Diocese of Chifeng/Chihfeng is a diocese located in the city of Chifeng (Inner Mongolia) in the Ecclesiastical province of Shenyang in China.

History
 1922: Established as the Apostolic Prefecture of Chifeng 赤峰 from the Apostolic Vicariate of Eastern Mongolia 東蒙古
 January 21, 1932: Promoted as Apostolic Vicariate of Chifeng 赤峰
 April 21, 1949: Promoted as Diocese of Chifeng 赤峰

Leadership
 Bishops of Chifeng (Roman rite)
 Fr. Luke Zhao Qing-hua (趙慶化) (January 11, 1932 – 1949)

References

 GCatholic.org
 Catholic Hierarchy

Roman Catholic dioceses in China
Christian organizations established in 1922
Roman Catholic dioceses and prelatures established in the 20th century
Religion in Inner Mongolia
Chifeng